In mathematics, specifically in surgery theory, the surgery obstructions define a map  from the normal invariants to the L-groups which is in the first instance a set-theoretic map (that means not necessarily a homomorphism) with the following property when :

Sketch of the definition

The surgery obstruction of a degree-one normal map has a relatively complicated definition.

Consider a degree-one normal map . The idea in deciding the question whether it is normally cobordant to a homotopy equivalence is to try to systematically improve  so that the map  becomes -connected (that means the homotopy groups  for ) for high . It is a consequence of Poincaré duality that if we can achieve this for  then the map  already is a homotopy equivalence. In fact it is more convenient to use homology of the universal covers to observe how connected the map  is. More precisely, one works with the surgery kernels  which one views as -modules. If all these vanish, then the map  is a homotopy equivalence.

Any degree-one normal map can be made -connected by the process called surgery below the middle dimension. After this is done there are two cases.

1. If  then the only nontrivial homology group is the kernel . This defines a symmetric bilinear form in case  and a skew-symmetric bilinear form in case . It turns out that these forms can be refined to -quadratic forms, where . These -quadratic forms define elements in the L-groups .

2. If  the definition is more complicated. Instead of a quadratic form one obtains from the geometry a quadratic formation, which is a kind of automorphism of quadratic forms. Such a thing defines an element in the odd-dimensional L-group .

Geometrically the reason why this is not always possible is that performing surgery in the middle dimension to kill an element in  possibly creates an element in  when  or in  when . So this possibly destroys what has already been achieved. However, if  is zero, surgeries can be arranged in such a way that this does not happen.

Example

In the simply connected case the following happens.

If  there is no obstruction.

If  then the surgery obstruction can be calculated as the difference of the signatures of M and X.

References

Surgery theory